Wigand of Marburg was a German herald of the Teutonic Knights in Prussia and one of the notable chroniclers of the Middle Ages.

Wigand expanded upon the earlier work of Nikolaus von Jeroschin. His Chronica nova Prutenica (New Prussian Chronicle) is one of the principal sources of information used for the history of the Prussian lands and parts of the adjoining Grand Duchy of Lithuania, covering the period between 1293 and 1394. Originally written in Middle High German rhymed prose, the work combined actual accounts with legends, folk tales, and myths. Out of an estimated length of 17,000 lines, only about 500 have survived to the present day. However, in 1464, the Polish chronicler Jan Długosz, speaking little German, requested that  translate Wigand's chronicle into Latin, and Gesselen's translation has survived almost intact.

Wigand's Chronica nova Prutenica is sometimes referred to in German sources simply as "[the] 'chronicle of Thorn'/'Thorn chronicle' from 1293 to 1394", possibly because Gesselen's Latin translation was found in Thorn in 1821 or because Gesselen spent part of his life there.

Notes and references

External links
 Latin translation of Chronica nova Prutenica published by Theodor Hirsch, with commentary, in Scriptores Rerum Prussicarum
 Information about the edition of Chronica nova Prutenica in Scriptores Rerum Prussicarum

14th-century German historians
Lithuanian chronicles
German chroniclers
People from Marburg
Teutonic Knights
People from the State of the Teutonic Order
Year of birth unknown
Year of death unknown
German male non-fiction writers
14th-century Latin writers